Vaibhav Arora (born 14 December 1997) is an Indian cricketer. The Haryana-born cricketer made his first-class debut on 9 December 2019, for Himachal Pradesh in the 2019–20 Ranji Trophy. He made his Twenty20 debut on 10 January 2021, for Himachal Pradesh in the 2020–21 Syed Mushtaq Ali Trophy.

In February 2021, Arora was bought by the Kolkata Knight Riders in the IPL auction ahead of the 2021 Indian Premier League. He made his List A debut on 21 February 2021, for Himachal Pradesh in the 2020–21 Vijay Hazare Trophy, taking a hat-trick in the match. In February 2022, he was bought by the Punjab Kings in the auction for the 2022 Indian Premier League tournament. On his Punjab Kings debut, Arora took the wickets of Robin Uthappa and Moeen Ali.

References

External links
 

1997 births
Living people
Indian cricketers
People from Ambala
Himachal Pradesh cricketers
Punjab Kings cricketers